Caligaris is a surname. Notable people with the surname include:

 Dave Caligaris (born 1956), Greek American basketball player
 Umberto Caligaris (1901–1940), Italian footballer and manager

See also
 Caligari (disambiguation)